Histone-lysine N-methyltransferase SUV39H2 is an enzyme that in humans is encoded by the SUV39H2 gene.

References

Further reading